Rangula Kala (English: A Colourful Dream) is a 1983 Indian Telugu-language drama film written and directed by B. Narsing Rao. The film won the Best Feature Film in Telugu, at the 31st National Film Awards "For a vivid portrayal of urban life as seen by a sensitive painter in search of his identification with the masses". It was screened in "Indian Panorama" of the 9th International Film Festival of India.

Plot
The film chronicles the life a skilled painter who fails to gain recognition, subsequently gets idealistically inspired to oppose the art of the elite.

Soundtrack
The soundtrack and lyrics were composed by Telangana balladeer Gaddar.
Jam Jamalmarri by Gaddar
Bhadram Koduko by Gaddar
Nare nannare Nare nannare

Awards
 Nandi Award for Best Supporting Actress - K. Sankutala

References

1983 films
Films about social issues in India
1980s Telugu-language films
Best Telugu Feature Film National Film Award winners
Films about the arts
Films about fictional painters
Indian drama films
Films shot in Telangana
Films about Naxalism
Indian avant-garde and experimental films
1990s Telugu-language films
Fictional portrayals of police departments in India
Social realism in film
Indian feminist films
Films about poverty in India
Films directed by B. Narsing Rao